Trine Helene Andresen-Svendheim (born 28 November 1955) is a Norwegian artistic gymnast. 

She was born in Oslo. She competed at the 1972 Summer Olympics.

References

External links 
 

1955 births
Living people
Sportspeople from Oslo
Norwegian female artistic gymnasts
Olympic gymnasts of Norway
Gymnasts at the 1972 Summer Olympics
20th-century Norwegian people